The Fiat New 500 (project 332) is a battery-electric city car by Italian manufacturer Fiat. It was unveiled on March 4, 2020, in Milan, Italy; it was scheduled to be launched at the Geneva Motor Show, but that event was canceled. The New 500 car is manufactured at the Mirafiori plant in Turin and is sold alongside the conventionally-powered 500 that was introduced in 2007, which will continue to be manufactured in Tychy, Poland. That 2007 car was used as the basis of a previous battery-electric Fiat 500e, which was sold only in the United States from 2013 and had a much smaller range than the New 500.

The New 500 has a  range on the European WLTP Combined test, and achieves  on that test's urban cycle, which is generally favourable toward electric vehicles. The car is powered by an 87kW (116hp) electric motor, fed by a 42kWh lithium-ion battery pack.

Overview
Sergio Marchionne called for Fiat Chrysler Automobiles to pivot towards electric and hybrid automobiles starting in 2018, including an all-new electric 500 by 2020. Previously, FCA had assembled the 500e, a battery-electric vehicle derived from the 2007 Fiat 500 but limited to the United States market only, at its Toluca Car Assembly plant in Mexico from December 2012 to June 2019. FCA showed the Fiat Centoventi concept at the Geneva Motor Show in March 2019; the Centoventi concept previewed what automotive industry believed to be a future battery-electric Fiat Panda, which in turn was expected to form the basis for the next electric Fiat 500. The concept Centoventi showcased a modular battery concept, allowing an extended range using dealer-installed battery packs.

In July 2019, FCA announced plans to invest  million in its Mirafiori plant to build a new production line devoted to its first battery-electric vehicle marketed in Europe, tentatively named the 500 BEV, with production to start in the second quarter of 2020. The new line was planned to have an annual production capacity of 80,000 500 BEVs. FCA invested another  million to build a battery production line at Mirafiori in October 2019. Camouflaged prototypes of the 500 BEV were photographed while undergoing tests in December 2019.

The public unveiling on March 4, 2020, previously scheduled for Geneva, was led by FCA Chief Marketing Officer Olivier François, who held the event in Milan "to show that FCA stands close to Milan and to Italy."

The New 500 sits on a totally new platform and is slightly bigger than its 2007 predecessor. Compared to the earlier 500 (2007), the New 500 is  longer,  wider, and  taller, with a  increase in wheelbase. The older 500, originally introduced in 2007, is equipped with an internal-combustion engine or a mild hybrid drivetrain and will remain on sale.

Models
The New 500 was initially available only as a two-door cabriolet four-seater in the "La Prima" trimline, with production limited to 500 examples per country. "La Prima" was available in one of three colors: Mineral Grey, Ocean Green, and Celestial Blue, designed to be reminiscent of the earth, sea, and sky, respectively; the soft top was finished with an exclusive monogram logo.

In Autumn 2021, Fiat announced a new Product Red branded edition, fitted with the 42kWh battery and available in hatchback and convertible styles, and the Passion trim level was withdrawn.

Limited production
Three additional one-off models styled by well-known designers were announced with the launch of the New 500; proceeds from the auctions of the 500 Giorgio Armani, B.500 "MAI TROPPO" ("never too much", by Bvlgari), and the 500 Kartell will benefit environmental organizations set up by Leonardo DiCaprio. The Kartell and Bvlgari models were created though a partnership between FCA and Altagamma. These were not the first Fiat-fashion limited editions; previously, Frida Giannini of Gucci had collaborated with Fiat Centro Stile to produce a special edition of the preceding Fiat 500 (2007 model), released in 2011.

Lasers were used to engrave the steel body panels are used on the Armani, which is finished in a "silk effect" grey-green matte finish which includes anti-pollution and anti-bacterial technologies. The seats are finished in a similar color leather from certified sources. After the car was unveiled in front of Duomo Cathedral, it was moved throughout Milan "to send a strong message of positivity to Italy, and to Milan in particular".

The Kartell is finished in a monochrome "Kartell blue" color, extending to metal, plastic, and rubber exterior surfaces. The wheels, front grille, side mirror housings, and dashboard are covered in a plastic texture derived from the brand's "Kabuki" lamp, and the seats are upholstered with 100% recycled polypropylene.

An "Imperial Saffron" orange paint finish is applied to the exterior of the B.500 from Bvlgari, using gold dust reclaimed from the firm's manufacture of jewelry; inside, recycled silk scarves from the marque cover the dashboard and are used to trim the leather seats. The steering wheel features a removable brooch set with amethyst, topaz, and citrine stones. In addition, a special hatbox and jewelry case were made for the B.500, and the gold key to the automobile (set with an ancient coin) may be worn as jewelry as well.

Abarth New 500

The Abarth New 500 is a performance variant that will be released in 2023. It made its official debut on November 22, 2022, featuring unique scorpion-badged alloy wheels. Initially, it will be released in a "Scoprionissima" edition limited to 1,949 examples. "Scorpionissima" models will be available in a choice of "Acid Green" or "Poison Blue" colors, bearing unique side graphics and wheels.

Track sacrifices range for performance. In manufacturer testing at Balocco, the Abarth New 500 is able to complete laps 1 second quicker than the Abarth 695.

Charging the Abarth New 500 is possible at rates up to 85 kW, an improvement over the regular New 500; the Abarth is equipped with the larger 42 kW-hr battery.

North America
Fiat is expected to unveil the North American specification New 500 at the 2023 Los Angeles Auto Show, before going on sale in the first quarter of 2024 as a 2024 model year. At the 2022 LA Auto Show, held in November, Fiat brought three 500-based concepts designed by Armani, Kartell and Bvlgari.

600
Expected to be unveiled in the spring of 2023, the Fiat 600 will be a 5-door crossover version of the New 500.

Sales and production
Production began in February 2020, shortly after FCA completed the new production line at Mirafiori. However, production was paused starting on March 13 during the nationwide lockdown in Italy due to the spread of coronavirus infections.

Sales are currently limited to Europe only, with other markets, including Brazil, to follow starting in 2021. Exports to the U.S. could follow if there is sufficient demand. The New 500 competes with electric city cars like the Mini Electric, Honda e and Smart Forfour.

Equipment

The New 500 is the first city car with level 2 autonomous driving, and the first FCA car equipped with the new UConnect 5 infotainment system. The ADAS systems include Autonomous Emergency Brake with pedestrian and cyclist detection; Intelligent Speed Assistant; Lane Control; Intelligent Adaptive Cruise Control (iACC) and Lane Centering; and Emergency Call.

The Android-based UConnect 5 infotainment system is displayed on a  touchscreen. It has Android Auto and wireless Apple CarPlay connectivity, automatic call to the emergency services, and can also be used to monitor the car (or control certain functions) remotely using a smartphone app.

Under European Union law, all EVs must produce some form of noise at low speeds to make pedestrians aware of their presence. Most cars use a spaceship-like tone, but the New 500 will instead play the score from Amarcord, composed by Nino Rota, when cruising below . According to Fiat, alternative sounds will be downloadable in the future.

Performance

The New 500 is offered with a choice of two motor and battery combinations. One is fitted to the entry level "Action" trim in the UK, equipped with a  motor and a 24 kWh battery (21.2 kWh usable) that charges at up to 50 kW. The second are equipped in the higher level "Passion", "Icon", Red and "La Prima" trims, with a  motor, 42 kWh battery (37.3 kWh usable), and 85 kW charger.

The New 500 has three driving modes branded "Normal", "Range", and "Sherpa". Range mode enables one-pedal driving, with strong regenerative braking as the throttle pedal is lifted.

Charging

The New 500 is equipped with an 85 kW fast charger system (except the 24kWh model which can charge up 50kW). It takes 5 minutes to charge enough to travel . The fast charger can charge the battery to 80% in just 35 minutes. A CCS Combo Type 2 socket located on the rear right fender of the car accommodates both AC and DC charging, with all models able to receive up to 11kW AC charging. The Launch Edition also includes the easyWallbox, a home charging station developed by Engie for FCA that can be connected to a normal home outlet to supply power at 2.3 kW; the easyWallbox can be upgraded to supply up to 7.4 kW.

Safety

Euro NCAP
The 500e in its standard European configuration received 4 stars from Euro NCAP in 2021.

Notes

References

External links

 

  

Production electric cars
Cars introduced in 2020
City cars
Convertibles
New 500
Hatchbacks
Euro NCAP superminis
Retro-style automobiles